Bennani is a surname. Notable people with the surname include:

Abdelaziz Bennani (born 1935), Moroccan general, former inspector of the Royal Armed Forces, and commander of the southern zone
 (born 1939), Moroccan lawyer and human rights activist
 (born 1958), Moroccan writer and poet
Aziza Bennani (born 1943), Moroccan academic and politician
 (born 1940), Algerian actor
Hamdi Benani (1943–2020), Algerian singer and musician
Hamid Bénani (born 1940), Moroccan film director and screenwriter
 (born 1948), Moroccan psychiatrist, psychoanalyst and writer
Karim Bennani (born 1936), Moroccan painter
Mehdi Bennani (born 1983), Moroccan racing driver
Salma Bennani (born 1978), princess consort of Morocco.
Zineb Benani (born 1940), Moroccan human-rights activist, former politician, writer and painter